Llanbedrgoch is a hamlet and post town, a mile south of the town of Benllech and west of Red Wharf Bay, on the island of Anglesey, north Wales.  The parish church is St Peter's Church, Llanbedrgoch, a Grade II* listed building that dates back to the 15th century.

The historical settlements in the area have been subject of archaeological exploration. The village hosted the National Eisteddfod of Wales in 1999.

Prior to the 2013 council elections, Llanbedrgoch was a single councillor ward to the Isle of Anglesey County Council, though following The Isle of Anglesey (Electoral Arrangements) Order 2012 the ward was amalgamated into a new multi-councillor ward, Lligwy.

Notable people
 Gwyn Hughes Jones (born 1969) operatic tenor in romantic Italian operatic repertoire.
 Kiri Pritchard-McLean (born 1986), a Welsh comedian and writer.

References

Former wards of Anglesey
Villages in Anglesey
Llanfair-Mathafarn-Eithaf